Pius Latin for "pious", is a masculine given name. Its feminine form is Pia.

It may refer to:

People

Popes
 Pope Pius (disambiguation)
 Antipope Pius XIII (1918-2009), who led the breakaway True Catholic Church sect

Given name
 Pius Bazighe (born 1972), Nigerian javelin thrower
 Pius Heinz (born 1989), German professional poker player who won the 2011 World Series of Poker Main Event
 Pius F. Koakanu (died 1885), Hawaiian politician
 Pius Ncube, Catholic Archbishop of Harare and outspoken critic of Robert Mugabe
 Pius Schwert (1892-1941), American politician and baseball player

Surname
 Märt Pius (born 1989), Estonian actor
 Priit Pius (born 1989), Estonian actor

Fictional characters
 Pius Thicknesse, in the Harry Potter series
 Pius XIII the eponymous Pope in the HBO series The Young Pope
 Pius XV, in the Babylon 5 science fiction saga, a fictional early 22nd century pope featured in the novel Dark Genesis

See also
 PIUS reactor, a Swedish design for a nuclear reactor not reliant on active safety measures
 Pius, epithet of Trojan hero Aeneas
 Antoninus Pius, Roman Emperor (138-161)
 Quintus Caecilius Metellus Pius (c. 130-63 BC), Roman consul and soldier
 Louis the Pious, Holy Roman Emperor (813-840)
 Pio (given name),  the Italian form of Pius

References